Vlastimir Peričić (7 December 1927 in Vršac – 1 March 2000 in Belgrade) was a Serbian composer and one of the most important theoreticians of Serbian music, well-known musicologist and the author of extremely valuable university textbooks, as well as a corresponding member of the Serbian Academy of Arts and Sciences.

Biography 
Vlastimir Peričić was the son of Juraj and Jelica Peričić, maiden name Nikolajević .

Attended elementary school in Zemun from 1934 to 1938, grammar school in Zemun from 1938 to 1941 and in Belgrade from 1941 to 1946. Enrolled high school of music at the Belgrade Academy in 1941, the Music Academy in 1945, graduated from the Department of Composition at the Music Academy of Belgrade (the class of professor Stanojlo Rajičić) in 1951.

In the period from 1945 to 1947 worked as an intern in the Natural History Museum in Belgrade, from 1948 to 1951 as a part-time lecturer of solfeggio and basic music theory at the Music School Josif Marinković in Belgrade, from 1951 to 1955 as a professor of theoretical subjects in the Secondary School of Music at the Academy of Music (now the School of Music Slavenski).

Vlastimir Peričić spent the school year 1955—1956 training at the Academy of Music and Drama Art (Akademie für Musik und darstellende Kunst) in Vienna (class for composition of professor Alfred Uhl). During the summer 1956 he attended courses for contemporary music in Darmstadt (Germany).

In 1955 he was elected an assistant at the Department of Composition of the Academy of Music in Belgrade (now the University of Arts in Belgrade Faculty of Music)), 1961 Assistant Professor at the Department of Music Theory, 1965 Associate Professor, 1988 full professor. From 1967 to 1971 he also taught at the Department of I stage education in Niš. He taught various theoretical subjects (harmony, harmonic analysis, counterpoint, musical forms, analysis of musical works, tone movement, knowledge of instruments, etc.), and since 1971 the history of Yugoslav music at the Department of Musicology.

He was a mentor to 51 candidates from the theoretical courses and 27 from the history of Yugoslav music for their final exam, as well as to 6 postgraduates.

He retired as a professor of the Faculty of Music in Belgrade in 1993.

He died in Belgrade on 1 March 2000.

For 80 anniversary of composer's birth, 7 December 2007, in Music and Information Centre SOKOJ in Belgrade, the first part of the Legacy Vlastimir Peričić was opened.

Academy of Music, University of East Sarajevo, opened the second part of the Legacy Vlastimir Peričić.

Recognitions and awards 

Vlastimir Peričić won several awards and recognitions.
Here are just some of them:
 Award of People's Youth of Yugoslavia for the handful II (1948) and the handful III (1950)
 Award at the International competition Giovanni Battista Viotti, Vercelli (Italy), for String quartet, 1950
 Award of the Association of Serbian Composers for Simfonijeta, 1959

Writings about the author  

 Josip Andreis, Dragotin Cvetko, Stana Djuric-Klein: The historical development of music culture in Yugoslavia, Zagreb, School Book, 1962, 708 pages
 Vlastimir Peričić, with the cooperation of Dušan Kostić and Dusan Skovran: Music makers in Serbia (the text about V. Peričić  written by Dušan Skovran), Belgrade, Prosveta, 1969, 373–582 pages
 Stana Đurić-Klajn: Introduction to the History of Yugoslav Music, Beograd, Umetnička akademija u Beogradu, Muzička akademija, 1963
 Nenad Turkalj: Small History of Music, Naprijed, Zagreb, 1963, 149.
 Yugoslav contemporaries, Library Lexicon, Who is Who in Yugoslavia 1970, Belgrade, Chronometer, 1970
 Dejan Despić: Vlastimir Peričić, Pro Musica 140, 1989, 5–6
 Dejan Despić: Interview with Vlastimir Peričić, Novi zvuk 2, 1993, 5–10.
 Larousse de la musique, Pariz, 1957, vol. II, 179 (F. Zagiba)
 Music Encyclopedia JLZ, Zagreb, 1963, vol. II, 389 (D. Skovran)
 Enciklopedija Jugoslavije, Zagreb, 1965, vol. VI, 466 (D. Skovran)
 Album kompozitora, Association of Music and Ballet pedagogues of Serbia, Beograd, 1970
 Dušan Plavša,  Music Art, Encyclopedic Lexicon – Mozaik znanja, Interpres-Beograd, 1972. 
 Lexicon of Yugoslav music, Zagreb, 1984, sv. II, 160 (J. Zec)
 The New Grove Dictionary of Music and Musicians, London, 1980, vol. XIV, 405 (h. – 0 'Loughlin)
 Irena Grickat: Vlastimir Peričić, Multilingual dictionary of musical terms, Južnoslovenski Filolog XLII, 1986, 223–226
 Dejan Despić: Vlastimir Peričić, Instrumental and vocal and instrumental counterpoint, Zbornik Matice srpske za scenske umetnosti i muziku, 2, Novi Sad 1987, 240–242
 Momir Đoković, Lexicon, Who is Who in Serbia 1991, Beograd, Bibliofon, 1991.
 Roksanda Pejović: Music composition and performance from 18 century to the present
 Melita Milin: Vlastimir Peričić

List of works 
His idiom in music writing is based on neo-romanticism, with some tendencies towards freer and bolder vertical structures. In his works, which are characterized by clarity and fine technical touch, there prevails some inclination towards sonata-cyclic forms.

1. Dve narodne for mixed choir (Megla se kadi, 1946, 2' ; Tri godini, 1946, rev. 1948, 4')
2. Tri minijature za klavir (Canzonetta, Valse, Chant sans paroles, 1947, 6')
2a. Tri minijature za klarinet i klavir (Canzonetta – Dedication to Tchaikovsky, Valse mignonne – Tribute to Chopin, Chant sans paroles – Dedication to Mendelssohn, 1995, 6')
3. Intermeco za klavir, 1947, 4'
3a. *Intermeco (Dedication to Brahms) for clarinet and piano, 1996, 4'
4. Menuet for string quartet, 1947, 3'
4a. Menuet (Dedication to Haydn) for clarinet and piano, 1995, 3'
4b. Menuet (Dedication to Haydn) for Clarinet and Strings, 1995, 3' 5.
5. Three solos (U troje, Grm, Bila jednom ruža jedna), 1948, 9'
6. Two mixed choirs (Grm, Veče na školju), 1948, 6'
7. Pesme iz Vranja (I handful) for mixed choir, 1948, 4'
8. Tema s varijacijama za klavir, 1948, 12'
9. Pesme iz Makedonije (II handful) for mixed choir, 1948, 5'
10. Sonata za klavir in F- minor, 1949, 22'
10a. Skerco za klarinet i klavir (II movement from violin Sonata), 1996, 4'
11. Pepeljuga, music for children's puppet play, for small orchestra,1949, 20'
11a. Mala svita from "Pepeljuge" for chamber orchestra, 1949, 10'
11b. Mala svita from "Pepeljuge" for piano, 1949, 10'
11c. Pesma i igra  for violin and piano, 5'
11d. Pesma i igra for violin and strings, 5'
11e. Pesma i igra for clarinet and piano, 1994, 5'
11f. Pesma i igra for clarinet and strings, 1994, 5'
11g. Marš (Dedication to Prokofiev) for clarinet and piano, 1995, 2'
11h. Svitanje, for clarinet and piano, 1995, 3'
11i. Kolo, for clarinet and piano, 1995, 3'
11k. Svitanje, for violin and piano, 1909.
11l. Marš, for violin and piano, 1990.
12. Pesme iz Dalmacije (III handful) for mixed choir, 1049, 5'
13. Gudački kvartet, d- minor, 1950, 25'
14. Šumske idile, a song cycle for voice and piano (Cvračak, Mrtvi lugar, Orao), 1950, 9'
15. Novela od Stanca, the music for scene, 1950, 12'
16. Simfonijski stav za veliki orkestar, in G- minor, 1951, 14'
17. Sonatina za violinu i klavir, in E- major, 1951, 9'
17a. Sonatina Des-dur (Dedication to Suk) for clarinet and piano, 1996, 9'
17b. Berceuse avec des badineries (II movement from Sonatine), for clarinet and piano, 1995, 3'
18. Sonatina za klavir, 1952, 8'
18a. Posveta Bartoku (II movement from Sonatine), for clarinet and piano, 1996, 3'
19. Fantasia quasi una sonata, for viola and piano in G-minor, 1954, 14'
19a. Fantasia quasi una sonata, for violin and piano in D-minor, 1954, 14'
20. Pasakalja za violončelo i klavir, 1955, 9'
21. Mala svita za tri violine (Fughetta, Scherzando, Lamento, Moto perpetuo), 1955, 10' (lost)
22. Simfonieta za gudački orkestar, 1956–57, 25'
23. Tri pesme Rabindranatha Tagore, for voice and piano, 1957, 9'
24. Music for children's film Drveni konjić, for piano, 1957, 9'
25. Noć bez jutra, song cycle for voice and piano, 1959, 8'
26. Preludijum za klavir, 1960, 2'
27. Gradinar, song cycle for voice and piano, 1962–64, 15'
28. Sonatina za klarinet i klavir (Tribute to Dvorak) in F-major, 1996, 8'
29. Sonatina breve for clarinet and piano (Dedication to my professor Stanojlo Rajičić) in D-minor, 1996, 5'
30. Ciacconetta for clarinet and piano, 1996, 3'
31. Sarabanda e Fugeta for clarinet and piano, 1946/1996, 4'
32. Sonata za violončelo i klavir in B-minor, 1955/1996, 22' (includes no.20 Passacaglia)
33. Dve etide za klarinet i klavir, 1997, 3'
34. Tri dueta za dva klarineta i klavir, 1997, 4'
35. Kto Bog velij for mixed choir, 1998, 2'
35a. Kto Bog velij for male chorus, 1998, 2'

Orchestration 

 Vitězslav Novák: Hajdučka sonatina (Zbojnická sonatina), for piano. Arrangement for symphony orchestra, 1949, Rkp.: Score and parts with the author.
 Modest P. Musorgski: Pesme i igre smrti (Песни и пляски смерти) for voice and piano. Adaptation for bass and orchestra, 1959. First performed 4 June 1963, Belgrade, Miroslav Čangalović and the Belgrade Philharmonic Orchestra. Also performed in Italy. Rkp.: Score with M. Čangalović.
 Radivoj Lazić – Vlastimir Peričić: Three small pieces (Miniature Waltz, Lullaby, Story of a Wild West) for clarinet and piano. Adaptation for clarinet and string orchestra, 1997. Rkp.: Score and parts with the author.
 Radivoj Lazić – Vlastimir Peričić Romantic Concert in A-minor for clarinet and piano. Adaptation for clarinet and orchestra, 1998/99, RKP.: Score and parts with the author.
 Radivoj Lazić – Vlastimir Peričić: Introduction, Theme and Variations for clarinet and piano. Adaptation for clarinet and string orchestra, 1998/99, RKP.: Score and parts with the author.
 Radivoj Lazić – Vlastimir Peričić: Concertino in G-minor for clarinet and piano. Adaptation for clarinet and orchestra, second version for clarinet and string orchestra, 1998/99. Rkp.: Score and parts with the author.
 Radivoj Lazić – Vlastimir Peričić: Triptych for my father (Nostalgic Waltz, Epitaph, Humoresque) for clarinet and piano. Adaptation for clarinet and string orchestra, 1998/99. Rkp.: Score and parts with the author.
 Radivoj Lazić – Vlastimir Peričić: From my intimate diary (Confession, smile through the tears) for clarinet and piano. Adaptation for clarinet and chamber orchestra, 1998/99. Rkp.: Score and shares with the author.
 Radivoj Lazić – Vlastimir Peričić: Two moods (Melancholy, Hilarity) for clarinet and piano. Adaptation for clarinet and chamber orchestra, 1998/99. Rkp.: Score and parts with the author.
 Radivoj Lazić – Vlastimir Peričić: Two character pieces (Romantic melody, Caprice concertant) for clarinet and piano. Adaptation for clarinet and chamber orchestra, 1998/99. Rkp.: Score and parts with the author.
 Radivoj Lazić – Vlastimir Peričić: Little Suite (Arietta, Melancholic waltz, Elegant elegy, Cavatina, Marsh of dwarfs) for clarinet and piano. Adaptation for clarinet and string orchestra, 1998/99. Rkp.: Score and parts with the author.
 Radivoj Lazić – Vlastimir Peričić: Minuet under the branches of lilac for clarinet and piano. Adaptation for clarinet and string orchestra, 1998/99. Rkp.: Score and parts with the author.
 Radivoj Lazić – Vlastimir Peričić: Three Miniatures (Giocoso, Malinconico, Appassionato) for clarinet and piano. Adaptation for clarinet and string orchestra, 1998/99. Rkp.: Score and parts with the author.

Arrangements 

 Nicolò Paganini: Piano accompaniment for 8 capriccios.
 Dejan Marković: Piano accompaniment for the collection of miniatures for violin (30 pieces).
 Radivoj Lazić: Piano accompaniment for the miniatures for clarinet from the school I Am Studying Clarinet I-IV and collections The Singing Clarinet I-IV, Melodious Studies I-II, The Young Clarinet Virtuoso I-IV and Merry Days in the Music (about 100 pieces). Printed: Merry Days in the Music, Belgrade, Association of Music and Ballet Educators of Serbia, 1996; I Am Studying Clarinet and The Singing Clarinet I, Belgrade, Institute for Textbooks and Teaching Aids, 1997; The Young Clarinet Virtuoso I-III, Belgrade, copyright edition, 1997.
 Transcription for clarinet and piano, 65 pieces of world literature (Bach, Mozart, Beethoven, Chopin, Brahms, Tchaikovsky and others.) for the collection of R. Lazic – V. Peričić: Great Masters for Clarinet I-VI. Printed: Great Masters for Clarinet I-III, Belgrade, copyright edition, 1997.

Books

Scripts

Articles and Studies

Cooperation in encyclopedias 
 Music encyclopedia JLZ, Zagreb, vol. I 1958, vol. II 1963.
 Lexicon of Yugoslav Music, JLZ, Zagreb, I-II, 1984.

Translations

Redacting work

Other 
Texts for the programs of Radio Belgrade, Radio Skopje, for covers of the records in the BTB PGP, the program comments for the Belgrade Philharmonic Orchestra, Symphony Orchestra and Choir of Radio Belgrade, Musical Youth. Biographical articles on composers-academics on the occasion of the SANU exhibition, 1981, texts for the programs of concerts in the SANU Gallery, 1982/1983, etc..

See also 
 Bruno Brun

Literature 
 Twenty-five years of the Music Academy in Belgrade, 1937–1962, Grafos, Beograd, 1963, 95 pages.
 Forty years of the Faculty of Music (Music Academy), 1937–1977, Univerzitet umetnosti u Beogradu, Belgrade, 1977, 101 pages 
 Fifty years of the Faculty of Music (Music Academy), 1937–1987, Univerzitet umetnosti u Beogradu, Beograd, 1988, 158 pages

External links 
 Music creators in Serbia
 Vlastimir Peričić, biography
 Stojanović-Novičić Dragana: Subtle and Precise – minded sounding of Vlastimir Peričić

References

Serbian composers
Modernist composers
1927 births
2000 deaths
Members of the Serbian Academy of Sciences and Arts
University of Arts in Belgrade alumni
Academic staff of the University of Arts in Belgrade
Musicians from Belgrade